Saba Ahmed Soliman Mubarak El Siouf (born April 10, 1976 in Anjara, Jordan) is a Jordanian actress and producer. She graduated from Yarmouk University in 2001 with a bachelor's degree in Theater acting and Directing. In 1998, she started her acting career with her role in the Jordanian TV series directed by Mohamed Azizia Qamar wa Sahar. Since then, Mubarak has been part of many important TV dramas and films such as Balqis, Moga Harra, Al Ahd, the three seasons of Hekayat Banat from 2012 to 2017, the Price, Agent Hamilton: But Not If It Concerns Your Daughter and the Guest: Aleppo to Istanbul. She also had her first cinematic role in the Jordanian film Safar Al-Ajneha (Travel of the Wings) directed by Tha’er Mousa in 2003. Then she starred in several Jordanian films until her Egyptian cinema breakthrough, which came after her participation in Mohamed Amin's film Bentein Men Misr (Two Girls from Egypt). She is also the daughter of the Palestinian plastic artist Hanan Al-Agha.

In 2011, Mubarak established Pan East Media, a Jordanian media production company. The company started its production activity in 2013 through the TV series Zain and Tawq Al Asphalt in 2014.

Career 
Mubarak studied theater acting and directing at Yarmouk University, from which she graduated in 2001.

She started her acting career in 1998 in the Jordanian TV show directed by Mohamed Azizia Qamar wa Sahar. She is considered as a first rate performer in Arab drama and has performed in over 40 TV productions. She has appeared in several Syrian and Egyptian television series including Al-Kawasr, Al-Arwah Al-Muhajerah, Omar Khayyam, Sada Al-Rouh, Ahl Al-Gharam, Al-Wardah Al-Akheerah, Seerat Al-Hob, Haza Al-Aalam, Seraa Ala El Remal, Wara'a Al-Shams, Ana Al-Quds, Al-Za'eem, Naseem Al-Rouh, Sharbat Louz, Hekayat Banat, Moga Harra, Asia, Al-Ahd: Al-Kalam Al-Mobah, Afrah Al-Qoba, and Tayea''', in 2017, she started filming the third season of the 2012 TV series Hekayat Banat that follows the stories of four girls and their relationships, secret lives, dreams and ambitions. The series stars Mubarak alongside Horeya Farghaly, Dina El Sherbiny, Injy El Mokkaddem, Nada Moussa, Ramsi Lehner, and Amr Saleh.

Mubarak's debut in Arab cinema was in 2003 in the Tunisian film L'Odyssée. She has appeared in several Jordanian, Syrian and Egyptian films including Safar Al-Ajneha, Out of Coverage, Junoon Al-Hob, Transit Cities, Bentein Men Misr, Kingdom of the Ants, The Monk and The Price. She started working in Egypt in 2010 with her role in the film Bentein Men Misr (Two Girls from Egypt). In 2012, she participated in another Egyptian film, Al-Raheb (The Monk), alongside the Egyptian actor Hani Salama. Her third participation in Egyptian cinema was in Hisham Al-Aysawi's film The Price (Al Thaman), alongside the Egyptian actor Amr Youssef; she played a Syrian woman called Dima, who flees her home and takes refuge in Cairo, where she meets an Egyptian man called Magdy and then a mixture of events begin to unfold. She has taken part in two Swedish films Hamilton: In the Interest of the Nation and Agent Hamilton: But Not If It Concerns Your Daughter in 2012. Then she participated in the Turkish film The Guest: Aleppo to Istanbul.

In 2011, Mubarak established Pan East Media, a Jordanian production house owned and managed by Saba Mubarak with a main objective to create a genuine audio-visual content in Jordan and to present first-rate artistic work on both regional and international levels. The company started its production activity in 2013 with the light Jordanian comedy drama TV series Zain, which aired on multiple Arabic TV networks including MBC and Abu Dhabi One. In 2014, the company produced the TV series Tawq Al-Asphalt, a Bedouin historic drama series inspired by Shakespeare's Hamlet. It was aired during Ramadan 2014 on Abu Dhabi One.

 Filmography 

 Films 
 Actress 

 Producer 

 Television 

 Actress 
{| class="wikitable sortable"
!Title
!Year
!Role
!Notes
!Refs
|-
|Qamar wa Sahar|align=center|1998
|
|
|align=center|
|-
|Shawk El-Rahaf|align=center|1998
|Rahaf
|
|align=center|
|-
|Al-Kawasr|align=center|1998
|Buthainah
|
|align=center|
|-
|Omar Khayyam|align=center|2002
|Nesreen
|
|align=center|
|-
|Al-Arwah Al-Muhajerah|align=center|2002
|Amal
|
|align=center|
|-
|Al-Hajjaj|align=center|2003
|Ghazalah
|
|align=center|
|-
|Khalf Al-Qudban|align=center|2005
|Danah
|
|align=center|
|-
|Akhir Ayyam Al-Yamama|align=center|2005
|Al Shmous
|
|align=center|
|-
|Al-Shams Toshreq Min Jadeed|align=center|2005
|Maram
|
|align=center|
|-
|Khaled Ben Al-Waleed|align=center|2006
|Hend
|
|align=center|
|-
|Ahl Al-Gharam I|align=center|2006
|
|
|align=center|
|-
|Sada Al-Rouh|align=center|2006
|
|
|align=center|
|-
|Al-Wardah Al-Akheerah|align=center|2006
|Rudainah
|
|align=center|
|-
|Du'aah Ala Abwab Juhannam|align=center|2006
|
|
|align=center|
|-
|Seerat Al-Hob|align=center|2007
|
|
|align=center|
|-
|Nimer Bin Adwan|align=center|2007
|Wadha
|
|align=center|
|-
|Haza Al-Aalam|align=center|2007
|
|
|align=center|
|-
|The Invasion|align=center|2008
|Hanan
|
|
|-
|Oyoun Alia|align=center|2008
|Alia
|
|align=center|
|-
|Seraa Ala El Remal|align=center|2008
|Al-Hunoof
|
|align=center|
|-
|Naseem Al-Rouh|align=center|2008
|Asaker
|
|align=center|
|-
|Ahl Al-Gharam II|align=center|2008
|
|
|align=center|
|-
|Balqis|align=center|2009
|Balqis
|
|align=center|
|-
|Balqis: Queen of Sheba|align=center|2009
|Balqis
|
|align=center|
|-
|Wara'a El-Shams|align=center|2010
|Mouna
|
|align=center|
|-
|Ana Al-Quds|align=center|2010
|
|
|align=center|
|-
|Bath Bayakhah|align=center|2011
|
|
|align=center|
|-
|Wein Matkaha Ewja|align=center|2011
|
|
|align=center|
|-
|Eila Ajab|align=center|2011
|
|
|align=center|
|-
|Kashf El-Aqne'ah|align=center|2011
|
|
|align=center|
|-
|Al-Za'eem|align=center|2011
|Jameela
|
|align=center|
|-
|Fee Meil|align=center|2012
|
|
|align=center|
|-
|Sharbat Louz|align=center|2012
|Rasha
|
|align=center|
|-
|Hekayat Banat I|align=center|2012
|Ahlam
|
|align=center|
|-
|Ma Betekhlas Hekayetna|align=center|2012
|
|
|align=center|
|-
|Khalaf-Allah|align=center|2013
|
|
|align=center|
|-
|Asia|align=center|2013
|Dr. Nardeen
|
|align=center|
|-
|Mawja Harrah|align=center|2013
|Jameela
|
|align=center|
|-
|Zain|align=center|2013
|Zain
|
|align=center|
|-
|Tawk Al-Asphalt|align=center|2014
|
|
|align=center|
|-
|Al-Ahd|align=center|2015
|Raya
|
|align=center|
|-
|Haq Mayyet|align=center|2015
|Nihal Mufeed
|
|align=center|
|-
|Afrah Al-Qobba|align=center|2016
|Doria
|
|align=center|
|-
|Hekayat Banat II|align=center|2017
|Ahlam
|
|align=center|
|-
|Hekayat Banat III|align=center|2017
|Ahlam
|
|align=center|
|-
|Tayea'|align=center|2018
|Mohga
|
|
|-
|Oboor|align=center|2019
|Salma
|
|
|-
|Nemra Etnin|align=center|2020
|Dana
|
|
|-
|Hares Al-Jabal|align=center|2020
|Rimal
|
|
|-
|Anbar 6|align=center|2021
|
|
|
|-
|Touba|align=center|2022
|Ehssan
|
|
|-
|Suits bil Arabi|align=center|2022
|Farida El-Masiri
|
|
|-
|Moon Knight|align=center|2022
|Ammit (voice)
|Episode: "Gods and Monsters"
|align=center|
|}

 Producer 

 Awards 
Mubarak has received several awards through her successful career:
 Best Actress Award, Middle East Film Festival 2003, Italy
 Best Jordanian and Arab Actress Award, Tyche Awards, Jordan
 Best Jordanian Actress Award, Jordan Awards, Jordan

 Personal life 
Mubarak was born to a Jordanian father (Ahmed Mubarak) and a Palestinian mother (Hanan Al-Agha). She has one sister, Aya Wuhoush. She got her bachelor's degree from Yarmouk University in Irbid in 2001. She is a fan of sports and nature. She spends time in the gym, as well as jogging or walking outside in nature. She also loves swimming and kickboxing.

Her first marriage to the late Tunisian director Chawki Mejri ended with divorce, and she has a son called Ammar since 2004.

Mubarak is a Muslim, but she played a Christian woman in the Egyptian film The Monk''.

See also
List of Jordanian actors
List of Jordanians

References

External links 

 

1976 births
Living people
Yarmouk University alumni
Jordanian actresses
Jordanian film actresses
Jordanian television actresses
Jordanian people of Palestinian descent